On 23 May 2009, Madhav Kumar Nepal was elected the new Prime Minister of Nepal, after his predecessor Pushpa Kamal Dahal resigned as the head of the government after president Ram Baran Yadav overruled the former cabinet's decision to dismiss the chief of the Nepalese Army. About 20 of the 25 parties represented in the 1st Nepalese Constituent Assembly voted in favour of Madhav Nepal, who was up for vote without an opponent. Three days after his election, the new Prime Minister was sworn in and started to form his coalition cabinet. After almost three weeks of talks, the cabinet was finalized on 17 June 2009.

Ministers

References 

Government of Nepal
Cabinet of Nepal
2009 in Nepal
2009 establishments in Nepal
2011 disestablishments in Nepal